Theopompus (Ancient Greek: Θεόπομπος) was an Athenian poet of the Greek Old Comedy, the son of Theodectus or Theodorus. He produced 24 plays.

Surviving Titles and Fragments
Twenty titles, along with ninety seven associated fragments, are all that survive of Theopompus' work.

 Admetus
 Althea
 Aphrodite
 Batyle
 Peace (Eirene)
 Hedychares
 Theseus
 Callaeschrus
 Barmaids (Kapelides)
 The Mede
 Nemea
 Odysseus
 Children (Paides)
 Pamphile
 Pantaleon
 Penelope
 Sirens
 Female Soldiers (Stratiotides)
 Teisamenus
 Phineus

References

Ancient Greek dramatists and playwrights
Ancient Greek poets
Ancient Athenians
Old Comic poets
5th-century BC Athenians